Dolný Vadičov is a village and municipality in Kysucké Nové Mesto District in the Zilina Region of northern Slovakia. It has a population of about 500 people.

History
In historical records the village was first mentioned in 1419.

Geography
The municipality lies at an altitude of 439 metres and covers an area of 5.952 km².

See also
 List of municipalities and towns in Slovakia

References

Genealogical resources
The records for genealogical research are available at the state archive "Statny Archiv in Bytca, Slovakia"

 Roman Catholic church records (births/marriages/deaths): 1666-1900 (parish B)

External links
https://web.archive.org/web/20071116010355/http://www.statistics.sk/mosmis/eng/run.html Dead Link
Surnames of living people in Dolny Vadicov

Villages and municipalities in Kysucké Nové Mesto District